All Ages is a compilation album by the American punk rock band Bad Religion. It was released on July 26, 1995, through Epitaph Records. The compilation contains songs from How Could Hell Be Any Worse? to Generator, and two live tracks recorded during their 1994 European tour, which were the first tracks to feature guitarist Brian Baker.

Background
All Ages contains material from six of Bad Religion's first seven studio albums released on Epitaph, omitting songs from the band's second album Into the Unknown. It also contains no tracks from the Bad Religion and Back to the Known EPs. The band had left Epitaph for Atlantic in 1993, where they reissued Recipe for Hate and began to experience major worldwide commercial success.

The live tracks "Do What You Want" and "Fuck Armageddon... This Is Hell" were recorded live at the Karen Klub in Goteborg, Sweden on October 8, 1994, on Bad Religion's Stranger than Fiction tour. These tracks were the first to feature guitarist Brian Baker, who had replaced Brett Gurewitz before the release of Stranger than Fiction.

Track listing

Only Japanese edition contains the song American Jesus from Recipe for Hate on track 23 as a bonus track.

References

External links

All Ages at YouTube (streamed copy where licensed)

Bad Religion compilation albums
1995 compilation albums
Epitaph Records compilation albums